Judith Carr (born September 13, 1938) is a former member of the Ohio House of Representatives. Carr was appointed to the Ohio House to complete the term of her late husband, Francis Carr. She represented Stark, Carroll, and Mahoning Counties.

References

Democratic Party members of the Ohio House of Representatives
Women state legislators in Ohio
Living people
1938 births
People from New Philadelphia, Ohio
21st-century American women